Let Your Body Take Over is the full-length debut album from the post-hardcore band Four Letter Lie.

Background and production
On February 11, 2006, Four Letter Lie signed to Victory Records; until April 2006, they played various across the country with a variety of bands. In May 2006, they went on a US tour with Glory of This. Let Your Body Take Over was recorded at Applehead Recording in Woodstock, New York in June 2006. Michael Birnbaum and Chris Bittner both produced, recorded and mixed the album. Michael Fossenkemper mastered it at Turtletone.

Release
On September 29, 2006, "Feel Like Flame" was posted on the band's Myspace profile; a music video appeared in early October 2006. "Naked Girl Avalanche" was posted on their Myspace on October 14, 2006; Let Your Body Take Over was released on October 31, 2006. In January and February 2007, the band supported Roses Are Red on their tour of the U.S.

Track listing
All songs written by Four Letter Lie, all lyrics written by Brian Nagan and Kevin Skaff.

Personnel
Personnel per back panel.

Four Letter Lie
 Brian Nagan – vocals
 Kevin Skaff – guitar, vocals
 Connor Kelly – guitar
 John Waltmann – bass
 Derek Smith – drums

Additional musicians
 Chris Bittner – additional keyboard, synth
 Doug Robinson – guest vocals (track 11)

Production and design
 Michael Birnbaum – producer, recording, mixing
 Chris Bittner – producer, recording, mixing
 Michael Fossenkemper – mastering
 Colin Strandberg – cover
 Sean Brant – layout
 Tim Harmon – inside photo

References

External links
Official Website
Official MySpace Profile

2006 albums
Four Letter Lie albums